The Newton Blackmour State Trail is a crushed limestone trail in northern Outagamie County in Wisconsin. The trail spans  on a former rail corridor. Its name is derived from the four communities the trail passes through: New London, Shiocton, Black Creek and Seymour. The trail's eastern end in Seymour connects to the Duck Creek Trail, which travels east through the Oneida Nation of Wisconsin and ends in the Village of Oneida.

The combined trails extend from the Village of Oneida to New London.

Access
The trail is open to bicyclists, walkers, joggers, horseback riders, and pets on leashes. In the winter the trail is open to cross-country skiing, snowshoeing, and snowmobiling.

Amenities
In the west end of the trail in New London there are hotels, campgrounds, and bike shops. Twenty minutes east of the trail in Ashwaubenon, there are also hotels and bike shops. In each of the communities the trail goes through, there are various restaurants, grocery stores, and gas stations very close to the path.

Trailheads
On the west end, the trail begins at House Road in New London. Eventually the trail will continue to Pfeifer Park near downtown New London. In the east, the trail doesn't seem to end at all, as it becomes the Duck Creek Trail east of Vandenhueval Road in Seymour. However, if a hiker begins in Seymour, the downtown area at Nagel Park makes a good trail head. Nagel Park is located at Main and Depot Streets in downtown Seymour. The trail runs right through the park. The park has a community museum, a train museum located in an old depot, and an old general store. There is plenty of public parking. Nearby are a grocery store, gas station, and several restaurants.

See also 
List of bike trails in Wisconsin
List of hiking trails in Wisconsin
List of rail trails
Rails-to-Trails Conservancy

References 

Wisconsin DNR
Advertiser Community News
Appleton Post Crescent
Outagamie County
Waupaca County News

Tourist attractions in Outagamie County, Wisconsin